The 2010 UEFA Women's Under-19 Championship Second qualifying round was the final qualifying round for the 2010 UEFA Women's Under-19 Championship and followed the 2010 UEFA Women's U-19 Championship First qualifying round. 23 teams came through that first round and were joined by top seed Germany.

The draw was made in Nyon on 11 November at 09.30CET. The 24 teams will be drawn into 6 groups of 4 teams, the winner of each group as well as the best runner-up will join hosts Macedonia in the finals next May and June.

Qualified teams

Matches

Group 1 
 Host country: Sweden

Group 2 
 Host country: Hungary

Group 3 
 Host country: Serbia

Group 4 
 Host country: Russia

Group 5 
 Host country: Netherlands

Group 6 
 Host country: Belgium

Ranking of group runners-up 
Match against fourth placed team are not counting in this ranking.

References 

Q2
2010,2
2010 in women's association football
2010 in youth sport